In the independent republic of Maldives, all islands except for 9 were hit by the 2004 Indian Ocean tsunami. 82 people were killed and 24 reported missing and presumed dead after the archipelago was hit by a tsunami caused by the 2004 Indian Ocean earthquake on 26 December 2004. Two-thirds of the capital city Malé was flooded during the first hours of the day. Outlying low-level atolls were badly affected, and some low-lying islands, including some of the major resorts, were submerged at the peak of the tsunami.

The government declared a state of national disaster and a special task force was set up to provide aid and supplies. Rescue efforts were hampered by loss of communication capability with the over one thousand islands that compose the nation, as well as by the lack of disaster planning.

Total damages are estimated to be nearly $460 million, which accounted for nearly 62% of the GDP.

Notes

External links 

Maldives Disaster Management Centre
Photos from Malé, Maldives
Blog with photos and thoughts from Maldives
 British Foreign Office advice for the Maldives.

Maldives
History of the Maldives
2004 in the Maldives